CFTRI School is in  Mysore, in the state of Karnataka, India.

History
The school was established in 1964 to provide education to the children of employees of the Central Food Technological Research Institute. The founder of the school was Mrs. Carolyn Parpia. It is an English medium school. The school follows the theme Sarvashikshan Abhiyan meaning "Education for all". The logo of the school is "Knowledge is Power". The school celebrated its silver jubilee in the year 1990. It is enjoying golden jubilee in 2014. It follows the syllabus entrusted by the Karnataka Government.

Recent
During the academic year 2012–13, new school uniform was introduced. A NCC Cadet of this school attended the Republic Day parade 2013 held at New Delhi. A student of this school got 618 out of 625 in SSLC 2013, therefore got 1st rank in District among SSLC students from Mysore District. The school is celebrating golden jubilee this year 2014.

Features
The school has a computer lab with over a 20 computers, a good library and a science lab. It has 2 big playgrounds. It has mid-day meals scheme. The school provides Cubs, scouts and guides training. 
Smart Classes ( Computer-based education ) is introduced for all classes from Kindergarten to 10th Std, from 2013 to 2014.

Location of the School on map 
CFTRI School Mysore on Google map

External links
 Official website of the School 
 News article related to performance of the school in SSLC 2013
 News article related to performance of the school in SSLC 2013

Schools in Mysore
Educational institutions established in 1964
1964 establishments in Mysore State